The 1803 Gatton by-election was a by-election to the House of Commons of the United Kingdom that took place on 24 January 1803.

The parliamentary borough of Gatton was a notorious "rotten" or pocket borough "in the pocket" of the Lord of the Manor of Gatton, who at that time was Sir Mark Wood. It had, at most, seven voters - all tenants of Wood. At the 1802 general election, "Wood returned himself and his brother-in-law [James] Dashwood". Both were members of William Pitt the Younger's faction of the Tory Party. At Pitt's request, shortly after the election, Dashwood vacated his seat so as to make way for Philip Dundas.

Result
Dundas was to be elected in a simple formality, returned uncontested. This was complicated, however, when "Joseph Clayton Jennings, a barrister and reformer, arrived on the scene", making it unexpectedly a contested election, and found a person who claimed to be entitled to vote in his favour. A voter was therefore also brought in for Dundas. Dashwood, acting as the returning officer, rejected the ballot for Jennings, and Dundas was duly elected with one vote.

Dundas left for India two years later, causing another by-election, wherein Wood procured the seat for William Garrow - another reformist barrister, who won it uncontested and thereby made his entry in Parliament.

1802 result

References

1803 elections in the United Kingdom
1803 in England
By-elections to the Parliament of the United Kingdom in Surrey constituencies
Reigate and Banstead
19th century in Surrey
January 1803 events